Cedi or Kedoi was a deme of ancient Attica, of the phyle of Erechtheis, sending two delegates to the  Boule. 

Its site is tentatively located near modern Ilioupoli.

References

Populated places in ancient Attica
Former populated places in Greece
Demoi